
Year 646 (DCXLVI) was a common year starting on Sunday (link will display the full calendar) of the Julian calendar. The denomination 646 for this year has been used since the early medieval period, when the Anno Domini calendar era became the prevalent method in Europe for naming years.

Events 
 By place 

 Byzantine Empire 
 Arab-Byzantine War: Alexandria is recaptured by the Muslim Arabs, after a Byzantine attempt (see 645) to retake Egypt fails, ending nearly 1,000 years of rule by Greco-Roman states in the city. 
 Gregory the Patrician, Byzantine exarch of Africa, begins a rebellion against Constans II, and proclaims himself emperor; the revolt finds broad support among the populace.

 Arabian Empire 
 Caliph Uthman ibn Affan founds the city of Jeddah (Saudi Arabia) on the coast of the Red Sea. He establishes a port for Muslim pilgrims making the required Hajj to Mecca.

 Africa 
 Battle of Nikiou: The Rashidun army (15,000 men) under Amr ibn al-'As defeats a smaller Byzantine force, near the fortified town of Nikiou (Egypt).
 Amr ibn al-'As builds fortifications in Alexandria and quarters a strong garrison in the vicinity, which twice a year is relieved from Upper Egypt.

 China 
 Summer – Emperor Taizong of the Tang Dynasty destroys the Xueyantuo state, during the campaign against the Xueyantuo (Central Asia).

 Japan 
 Emperor Kōtoku makes a decree about the policies of building tombs. He discontinues the old customs of sacrificing people in honor of a dead man, and forbids ill-considered rituals about purgation.
 A Great Reform edict changes Japan's political order. It will lead to the establishment of a centralized government with Kōtoku ruling from his palace, Naniwa Nagara-Toyosaki Palace, in Osaka.

 By topic 

 Religion 
 Xuanzang completes his book Great Tang Records on the Western Regions, which later becomes one of the primary sources for the study of medieval Central Asia and India.

Births 
 Abd al-Malik ibn Marwan, Muslim Caliph (d. 705)
 Gudula, Frankish saint 
 Li Sujie, prince of the Tang Dynasty (d. 690)
 Sun Guoting, Chinese calligrapher (d. 691)
 Tonyukuk, military leader of the Göktürks (approximate date)

Deaths 
January 17 – Sulpitius the Pious, bishop of Bourges
January 19 – Liu Ji, chancellor of the Tang Dynasty
unknown dates
 Gallus, Irish missionary (approximate date) 
 Zhang Liang, general of the Tang Dynasty

References

Sources